Andrzej Nowacki is an Op Art artist of Polish origin who lives and works in Berlin.

Early life 
Andrzej Nowacki was born on 15 October 1953 in Rabka, Poland. He spent his youth in Krakow. His first artistic experience was in interior design and art restoration. In 1977 he left Poland to study Scandinavian languages at the University of Gothenburg and later Art History in Innsbruck, Austria.

Career 
During the 1980s Nowacki discovered to himself Polish constructivism. Henryk Stazewski's art had an influence on the early works of Nowacki. Since the 1990s Nowacki had collaborated with Heinz Teufel, a collector who owned one of the most prestigious art galleries for concrete art in Europe, located in Cologne and later in Berlin.
 1994 Andrzej received a private scholarship in West Orange, N.Y.
 1997, 1998, 2000 and 2001 he participated in the workshops «Under the sign of Geometry» organized by Polish art critic Bozena Kowalska in Okuninka, Poland
 2001 he received a scholarship from the New York Pollock-Krasner Foundation
 2005 was his first exhibition in Osaka, Japan. Later, he spent a year in his studio at Anna Maria Island, Florida, USA, where he created reliefs for the Seth Jason Beitler Gallery in Miami
 2015 Nowacki moved to a new large-scale studio at the former industrial area in Ostrava Lower Vítkovice, Czech. Here he started to create his multi-part and large-format reliefs

Currently, Andrzej Nowacki lives and creates in Berlin, Germany.

Important exhibitions 
 1994	Lederman Fine Art Gallery, New York, USA
 1997 Exhibition in Galerie "Avantgarde", Berlin, Germany
 2000	Galerie Heinz Teufel, Berlin, Germany
 2005	KISSHO Fine Art Gallery, Osaka, Japany
 2006	Seth Jason Beitler Gallery, Miami, USA
 2008	Milan Dobeš Múzeum, Bratislava, Slowakei
 2009  National museum Stettin, Poland
 2011 Concrete art (Sztuka konkretna),  National Gallery of Art, Sopot, Poland 
 2017	Konkrete Anliegen. Sammlung Teufel, Kunstmuseum Stuttgart, Germany
 2017 "The magic of square", National Gallery of Art, Sopot, Poland 
 2019 Milan Dobes Museum "Mystery of a quarter"
2019 "Variation on black" AP atelier Praha AP atelier Praha,
And more than 50 other individual and group exhibition around the World.

Style and medium 
Op Art, Abstract Art, Concrete Art, Geometric Abstraction
Unique optical technique performed manually on masonite board with acrylic colors. Works bring the feeling of 3D perception. Viewer is the part of the work. Colours and shapes change depending on viewer's position and create the feeling of moment.

Since 1988 the sculptural form of the relief remains the exclusive medium of Nowacki's works.

Since 1995 colour has assumed the leading role as a means of expression.

From 1998, Nowacki's works are inspired by such artists as:  Max Bill, Josef Albers, Antonio Calderara and Bridget Riley. Impacted by Malevich and Ilya Chashnik, the square remains the obligatory form for the surface of his reliefs.

References

External links
WikiArt
https://www.porta-polonica.de/de/atlas-der-erinnerungsorte/andrzej-nowacki-erkundung-des-quadrats

Op art
Living people
Polish contemporary painters
1953 births